ISCAP is an abbreviation for:
Interagency Security Classification Appeals Panel 
Islamic State's Central Africa Province